Sorrell Booke (January 4, 1930 – February 11, 1994) was an American actor who performed on stage, screen, and television. He acted in more than 100 plays and 150 television shows, and is best known for his role as corrupt politician Jefferson Davis "Boss" Hogg in the television show The Dukes of Hazzard.

Early life and education
Booke was born in Buffalo, New York, the son of Sol Booke, a local physician. As a child, he entertained patients in his father's waiting room, and began acting on radio at nine. As a young radio actor he was known for his impersonations. He won a radio contest for mimicking the voice of Adolf Hitler, and appeared regularly as an actor on local radio stations WGR and WEBR. He attended Bennett High School and was valedictorian of the Class of 1946.

Booke enrolled in Columbia University at 16, and performed in Shakespearean plays in Columbia's drama club. He graduated from Columbia at 19 in 1949, and received a Master of Fine Arts at the Yale School of Drama. He served in the United States Army during the Korean War for two years as a counterintelligence officer.

Career
After his Army service, Booke appeared off-Broadway in The White Devil and had his first television role in the series Omnibus. His Broadway debut was in 1956, in Michael Redgrave's production of The Sleeping Prince. One prominent early role was that of Senator Billboard T. Rawkins in the 1960 revival of Finian's Rainbow. He also appeared in the films Black Like Me, A Fine Madness, What's Up, Doc? and Fail-Safe. In 1962, he starred in the Broadway musical Fiorello! as the title character.

Aside from his film roles, he appeared on numerous television shows such as Gunsmoke, Cannon, Ironside, Route 66, Hawaii Five-O, The Rockford Files, Full House, The Guiding Light and 12 O-Clock High. 

He worked as a voice actor in the 1980s and early 1990s. Booke also was a guest conductor at the Buffalo Philharmonic Orchestra.

Booke received an Emmy nomination for his appearance in Dr. Kildare in the episode "What's God to Julius?". He appeared in an episode of Mission: Impossible from the first season in 1966. Booke appeared in two early episodes of M*A*S*H, as General Barker in "Requiem for a Lightweight" and "Chief Surgeon Who?"; the latter marked the debut of the character Corporal Klinger, with whom Booke's character had previously dealt. He also had a recurring role in All in the Family as Mr. Sanders, personnel manager at Archie Bunker's workplace, Prendergast Tool and Die Company. (He had previously appeared on All in the Family as Lyle Bennett, the manager of a local television station.) Booke was featured on an episode of Good Times, and had a recurring role as the Jewish mob boss "Lefkowitz" on Soap. He also appeared in two episodes of Columbo, Swan Song in Season 3 (featuring Johnny Cash) and The Bye-Bye Sky High I.Q. Murder Case in Season 6. In 1976 he played a record producer in Rich Man, Poor Man Book II.

Booke's most notable role was in The Dukes of Hazzard as Boss Hogg, the humorously wicked antagonist to Bo and Luke Duke. The series ran on CBS for seven seasons, from 1979 to 1985. It spawned an animated series, The Dukes (1983), two reunion TV specials (by which time Booke had died, and the character of Boss Hogg was also said to be deceased), a feature film (2005) and The Dukes of Hazzard: The Beginning (a 2007 TV movie).

Booke had stopped appearing physically in acting roles, but he continued to perform voice work on several television shows and movies, occasionally as narrator, and sometimes as a cartoon character's voice, in such movies as Scooby-Doo Meets the Boo Brothers (1987 TV movie), Gravedale High (1990 television series), and Rock-A-Doodle (1991).

Personal life
He copied the Hogg character's American South drawl from U.S. senators Sam Ervin and Strom Thurmond.

Booke was fluent in French, Latin, Japanese, Korean, Spanish, Portuguese, Russian, Ukrainian, Belorussian, German, Greek and Italian. He said that he also “fussed" with a half-dozen other languages such as Arabic, Mandarin Chinese, Dutch, Persian, Polish, and Swedish. One of his hobbies was moving into and restoring rundown houses. In 1981, he lived in a "modest home on a modest street in Los Angeles," where he did his own gardening and carpentry. He called his Boss Hogg character "despicable," but enjoyed meeting with fans of the show.

Booke was married to Miranda Knickerbocker, then a senior at Barnard College, in 1958. She was the daughter of journalist Hubert Renfro Knickerbocker.  They had two children before divorcing in 1973.

Death
On February 11, 1994, Sorrell Booke died of colorectal cancer in Sherman Oaks, California. He is interred at the Hillside Memorial Park Cemetery in Culver City, California.

Partial filmography

Gone Are the Days! (1963) as Ol' Cap', Stonewall Jackson Cotchipee
Black Like Me (1964) as Dr. Jackson
Les Félins (1964) as Harry
Fail-Safe (1964) as Congressman Raskob
A Fine Madness (1966) as Leonard Tupperman
Up the Down Staircase (1967) as Dr. Bester
Matchless (1967) as Colonel Coolpepper
The Borgia Stick (1967) as Alton
Bye Bye Braverman (1968) as Holly Levine
What's Up, Doc? (1972) as Harry
Slaughterhouse-Five (1972) as Lionel Merble
The Iceman Cometh (1973) as Hugo Kalmar
The Take (1974) as Oscar
Devil Times Five (1974) as Harvey Beckman
Bank Shot (1974) as Al G. Karp
The Manchu Eagle Murder Caper Mystery (1975) as Dr. Melon
Mastermind (1976) as Max Engstrom
Special Delivery (1976) as Hubert Zane
Freaky Friday (1976) as Mr. Dilk
The Other Side of Midnight (1977) as Lanchon
Record City (1978) as Coznowski
The Cat from Outer Space (1978) as Presiding Judge (uncredited)
Rock-a-Doodle (1991) as Pinky, the Manager (voice)

Television work

The Guiding Light (1952)
Brenner (1959)
The Iceman Cometh (1960)
The Million Dollar Incident (1961)
Car 54, Where Are You?, as Police Commissioner Harper in "How High Is Up?" (1962) 
Route 66, as Sam Frazier in "Voice at the End of the Line" (1962) 
Naked City Beyond This Place There Be Dragons (9 episodes, 1960–1963)
The Patty Duke Show, as Gilbert Tugwell in "Block That Statue" (1964)
Twelve O'Clock High, as Sgt. Aronson in "Faith, Hope, and Sgt. Aronson" (1965)
Slattery's People as Max Rice in "Question: What's a Swan Song for a Sparrow?" (1965) 
New York Television Theatre (1965)
T.H.E. Cat – Episode 1 (1966)
Mission: Impossible (1967)
The Borgia Stick (1967)
Ironside Shell Game (1968)
The Wild Wild West, as Heisel in "The Night of the Egyptian Queen" (1968) 
Hawaii Five-O - "The Double Wall" (1970)
Room 222 (one episode 1971) as Mr Bomberg
All in the Family (1972-1977) as Joseph Sanders (4 episodes) / Mr. Bennett
Owen Marshall, Counsellor at Law (1971)
M*A*S*H (2 episodes, 1972) as Gen. Wilson Spaulding Barker
The Manhunter (1972)
Gunshot (1972)
Gunsmoke, in "Milligan" (1972) as Gerald Pandy
Alias Smith and Jones (1972)
Adventures of Nick Carter (1972)
Dr. Max (1974) as Dr. Scott Herndon
The Last Angry Man (1974) as Dr. Max Vogel
The New Dick Van Dyke Show (1974) as Herbie Vincent / Otto
Cannon (1974)
Columbo: Swan Song (1974) as J.J. Stringer
Kolchak: The Night Stalker (1974) as Mr. Eddy
Kung Fu, in "A Dream Within a Dream" (1974) as Sheriff Hodges
Adventures of the Queen (1975) as Robert Dwight
The Streets of San Francisco (1975) as Quincy Lloyd
Rich Man, Poor Man Book II (1976) 5 episodes, as Phil Greenberg
Brenda Starr (1976) as A.J. Livwright
The Bob Newhart Show (1976) as Mr. Perlmutter
Hunter, episode "The Lovejoy Files" (1977) as Mervyn 
Black Sheep Squadron Episode "Poor Little Lambs" (1977) as Father Phillipe
Mary Hartman, Mary Hartman (1977) as Rabbi Weintraub
The Greatest Thing That Almost Happened (1977) as Samuelson
The Amazing Howard Hughes (1977) as Fiorello LaGuardia
Columbo: The Bye-Bye Sky High I.Q. Murder Case (1977) as Bertie Hastings
Greatest Heroes of the Bible (1978)
Soap (1978) as Charles Lefkowitz
Good Times (1978) as Mr. Galbraith
Little House on the Prairie  (1978)
What's Happening!! (1978) as Mr. Finley
The Rockford Files "The Jersey Bounce" (1978) as Wade G. Ward
Bigfoot and Wildboy (1979)
The Dukes of Hazzard (1979-1985) as Boss Hogg / Jefferson Davis Hogg
The Love Boat (1980) as Lucius Kergo
The Dukes (1983) as Jefferson Davis 'Boss' Hogg (voice)
Alice (1983) as Jefferson Davis 'Boss' Hogg
The Pound Puppies (1985) as Mayor Fist aka The Mayor (voice)
Newhart (1985) as Sheik Fraser
Crazy Like a Fox (1986) as Bernard 'Bernie' Sinclair
You Again? (1986) as Roger Davidson
Scooby-Doo Meets the Boo Brothers (1987) as Sheriff Rufus Buzby / T.J. Buzby (voice)
Yogi and the Invasion of the Space Bears (1988) as Mountain Bear (voice)
Full House Episode "Our Very First Christmas Show" (1988) as Lionel / Santa Claus
The Smurfs (1988) (voice)
Fantastic Max (1988) (voice)
Don Coyote & Sancho Panda (1990) (voice)
Tom and Jerry Kids Show (1990) as Announcer (voice)
Gravedale High (1990) (voice)
Civil Wars (1991) as Charles Previn
Tiny Toon Adventures: How I Spent My Vacation (1992) as Big Daddy Boo (voice)
Capitol Critters (1992) (voice)
Bonkers (1993) as Boss Hoss (voice)
The New Adventures of Captain Planet (1993) as Sheriff Hebbs (voice)
Droopy, Master Detective (voice) (1993)

Stage appearances

The Sleeping Prince (1956)
Nature's Way (1957)
Heartbreak House (1959)
Fiorello! (1959–61) (replacement)
Finian's Rainbow (1960)
Caligula (1960)
Purlie Victorious (1961–62)
The White House (1964)
Jonah (1966)
The Iceman Cometh (1966)
Come Live with Me (1967)
Morning, Noon and Night (1968)

See also

References

External links
 
 
 
 

1930 births
1994 deaths
20th-century American male actors
United States Army personnel of the Korean War
American male film actors
American male stage actors
American male television actors
American male voice actors
Burials at Hillside Memorial Park Cemetery
Deaths from cancer in California
Deaths from colorectal cancer
Jewish American male actors
Male actors from Buffalo, New York
Military personnel from Buffalo, New York
United States Army officers
Yale School of Drama alumni
Columbia College (New York) alumni
20th-century American Jews